Mohammed Majid Hussain (born 9 April 1980) is an Indian politician who is currently the corporator of Mehdipatnam ward of the Greater Hyderabad Municipal Corporation and the former Mayor of Hyderabad He belongs to the All India Majlis-e-Ittehadul-Muslimeen party.

Early life
Hussain's schooling was at St Theresa's School, Humayun Nagar and Intermediate at Sultan Uloom College, Banjara Hills. After his intermediate, he enrolled for BCA at Anwar Uloom College, Mallepally.

Majid Hussain worked as an Executive with HSBC, migration and credit card division. After working for almost five years with the MNC, he left his job and plunged into active politics. Majid hails from a family of Educationists. Both his father and mother are retired gazetted officers. His father MH Maqsood is a retired physical director and was Chairman of AP selection committee of handball, while his mother Qaisar Jahan a government teacher, retired as headmistress of the Government Girls High School, First Lancer. Majid's brother Mohammed Shakir Hussain, who is a software professional, stays in the US.

Political career
Majid Hussain was apparently hand-picked by the MIM President Asaduddin Owaisi because of his suave personality & affable manners. Majid fought the Municipal Elections the first time on and won as the Corporator of Ahmednagar division in the 2009 GHMC Municipal elections.

On 4 January 2012, Majid's candidature as GHMC Mayor was proposed by MIM's Doodhbowli corporator MA Ghaffar and seconded by former mayor Banda Karthika Reddy. In a span of 15 minutes, the election process was completed and 31-year-old Majid Hussain was declared the new mayor of GHMC. After a gap of 12 years MIM's has succeeded in installing its own mayor in the city of Hyderabad and in the process created a record of sorts. The party has chosen 31-year-old Mohammad Majid Hussain, the youngest mayor the city has ever had.

On 31 October 2012, several developmental works worth Rs. 7 crore were inaugurated in Mayor Majid Hussain's division of Ahmednagar by Hyderabad MP and Majlis chief Asaduddin Owaisi. The division boasted of a new community hall, a ladies training centre, a ration shop at Syednagar and a new bus stop. 19 Feb 2013, The lone corporator of Majlis Bachao Tehreek (MBT), Amjadullah Khan, was forcibly evicted from the council hall when he rushed to the mayor's podium protesting the denial of an opportunity to speak during the GHMC budget discussion. As Khan protested by standing at the podium, the mayor called marshals and got him evicted from the council hall.

Majid Hussain had submitted his resignation on 7 March 2014 citing instructions from his party. The move was presented as honoring the agreement with Congress on seat-sharing but it was widely speculated that Mr. Hussain was being readied to contest from one of the Assembly constituencies in the city. Amid high drama, and apparently driven by political equations emerging ahead of the Assembly elections, the resignation of Mayor Majid Hussain was rejected by the GHMC's General Council.

Majid Hussain won as the Corporator of Mehdipatnam division in the 2016 GHMC Municipal elections.

During the Telangana Assembly elections, Majid Hussain was made the Election in-charge of Nampally Assembly constituency in which AIMIM won the Nampally seat.

In the 2019 General Elections, Majid Hussain was again made the election in-charge for Kishanganj seat.

Hussain again became the Corporator of Mehdipatnam in the 2020 GHMC Municipal Elections,

External links
 GHMC site
 Mohammad Majid Hussain at AIMIM

References

Living people
Mayors of Hyderabad, India
Politicians from Hyderabad, India
Indian Muslims
All India Majlis-e-Ittehadul Muslimeen politicians
1980 births